Shaheed Udham Singh College of Engineering & Technology (SUSCET) is a college and center of higher technical education and research offering graduate, post-graduate, and doctoral level research programs located in Chandigarh.

The School Symbol 
The Shaheed Udham Singh College school symbol is indigo blue and golden green. The colors of the symbol represent knowledge and growth, respectively.

Programs  

The college offers undergraduate programs in the following disciplines:

 Computer Science and Engineering
 Electronics and Communication Engineering
 Mechanical Engineering
 Civil Engineering
 Electrical Engineering
 Biotechnology
 Pharmacology

The college offers post-graduate programs in the following disciplines:

 Bio-Technology
 Computer Science and Engineering
 CAD/CAM
 Master of Business Administration
 Masters of Computer Applications
 M.Sc Biotechnology
 M.Sc Microbiology
 Master of Commerce

The college offers Diploma programs in the following disciplines:
 Computer Science and Engineering
 Electronics and Communication Engineering
 Mechanical Engineering
 Civil Engineering
 Electrical Engineering
 Automobile Engineering
 Medical and Lab Technology

References

External links
 

Universities and colleges in Punjab, India
Education in Mohali
1997 establishments in Punjab, India
Educational institutions established in 2002